Josimo Morais Tavares (Marabá, 1953 – May 10, 1986, Imperatriz) was a Catholic priest and coordinator of the Comissão Pastoral da Terra. He was assassinated by ranchers in an area which is now part of the Brazilian state of Tocantins, because of his support for the rights of rural workers.

Fontes

1953 births
1986 deaths
People from Marabá
20th-century Brazilian Roman Catholic priests
Workers' rights activists
People murdered in Brazil